Louis Le Brun (born 28 February 2002) is a French rugby union player. He currently plays as a centre, fly-half or full-back for Castres in the Top 14.

Coming from Var, his uncle is the former French international rugby union fly-half Yann Delaigue.

Career
Louis Le Brun was called by Fabien Galthié to the French national team for the first time in June 2022, for the summer tour of Japan.

References

External links
 
 All.Rugby

French rugby union players
Rugby union centres
Rugby union fly-halves
RC Toulonnais players
Castres Olympique players
Sportspeople from Var (department)
Living people
2002 births